Henry I Sinclair, Earl of Orkney, Lord of Roslin was a Scottish and a Norwegian nobleman. Sinclair held the title Earl of Orkney (which refers to Norðreyjar rather than just the islands of Orkney) and was Lord High Admiral of Scotland under the King of Scotland. He was sometimes identified by another spelling of his surname, St. Clair. He was the grandfather of William Sinclair, 1st Earl of Caithness, the builder of Rosslyn Chapel. He is best known today because of a modern legend that he took part in explorations of Greenland and North America almost 100 years before Christopher Columbus. William Thomson, in his book The New History of Orkney, wrote: "It has been Earl Henry's singular fate to enjoy an ever-expanding posthumous reputation which has very little to do with anything he achieved in his lifetime."

Biography

Henry Sinclair was the son and heir of William Sinclair, Lord of Roslin, and his wife Isabella (Isobel) of Strathearn. She was a daughter of Maol Ísa, Jarl of Orkney. Henry Sinclair's maternal grandfather had been deprived of much of his lands (the earldom of Strathearn being completely lost to the King of Scots).

Sometime after 13 September 1358, Henry's father died, at which point Henry Sinclair succeeded as Baron of Roslin, Pentland and Cousland, a group of minor properties in Lothian.

Although the Norwegian Jarldom of Orkney was not an inheritable position, successive appointments had operated as if it had been. After a vacancy lasting 18 years, three cousins – Alexander de L'Arde, Lord of Caithness; Malise Sparre, Lord of Skaldale; and Henry Sinclair – were rivals for the succession. Initially trialling de L'Arde as Captain of Orkney, King Haakon VI of Norway was quickly disappointed in de L'Arde's behaviour, and sacked him.

On 2 August 1379, at Marstrand, near Tønsberg, Norway, Haakon chose Sinclair over Sparre, investing Sinclair with the Jarldom or Earldom in the Peerage of Scotland. In return Henry pledged to pay a fee of 1000 nobles before St. Martin's Day (11 November), and, when called upon, serve the king on Orkney or elsewhere with 100 fully armed men for 3 months. It is unknown if Haakon VI ever attempted to call upon the troops pledged by Henry or if any of the fee was actually paid.

As security for upholding the agreement the new jarl left hostages behind when he departed Norway for Orkney. Shortly before his death in summer 1380, the king permitted the hostages to return home. In 1389, Sinclair attended the hailing of King Eric in Norway, pledging his oath of fealty.  Historians have speculated that in 1391 Sinclair and his troops slew Malise Sparre near Scalloway, Tingwall parish, Shetland.

Sinclair is later described as an "admiral of the seas" in the Genealogies of the Saintclaires of Roslin by Richard Augustine Hay. This refers to his position as the Lord High Admiral of Scotland while in service to the King of Scotland. It is a title he is said to have inherited from his father William Sinclair in 1358 but it's more likely he accquired it much later in life.

It is not known when Henry Sinclair died. The Sinclair Diploma, written or at least commissioned by his grandson states: "...he retirit to the parts of Orchadie and josit them to the latter tyme of his life, and deit Erile of Orchadie, and for the defence of the country was slain there cruellie by his enemiis..." We also know that sometime in 1401: "The English invaded, burnt and spoiled certain islands of Orkney." This was part of an English retaliation for a Scottish attack on an English fleet near Aberdeen. The assumption is that Henry either died opposing this invasion, or was already dead.

Henri Santo Claro (Henry St. Clair) signed a charter from King Robert III in January 1404. It is supposed that he died shortly after that although his son did not take the title until 1412. Therefore, he died somewhere between 1404 and 1412, killed in an attack on Orkney, possibly by English seamen. Or in an attack from the south.

According to Sir Robert Douglas, 6th Baronet, Sinclair had received the honours of the Orders of the Thistle, Saint Michael (Cockle) and the Golden Fleece. However all these orders were created after Sinclair's death.

Marriage and issue

Henry I Sinclair, Earl of Orkney, married Jean Haliburton, daughter of Sir Walter de Haliburton, 1st Lord Haliburton of Dirleton, and had issue:
 Henry II Sinclair, Earl of Orkney (c. 1375–1422), m. Egidia Douglas, daughter of Sir William Douglas of Nithsdale and his wife Egidia, daughter of King Robert II
 John Sinclair, said to have married Ingeborg, a natural daughter of Waldemar, King of Denmark
 William Sinclair
 Elizabeth Sinclair (b. 1363), m. Sir John Drummond of Cargill
 Margaret Sinclair, m. James of Cragy, Laird of Hupe in Orkney
 Marjory Sinclair, m. David Menzies of Menzies, and Weem
 Bethoc Sinclair, m. William Borthwick of Borthwick

One of his descendants is American actor-director Olivia Wilde.

Fringe theories
In the 1980s, modern alternative histories of Earl Henry I Sinclair and Rosslyn Chapel began to be published. Popular books (often derided as pseudo-history) such as The Holy Blood and the Holy Grail by Michael Baigent, Richard Leigh and Henry Lincoln (1982) and The Temple and the Lodge by Michael Baigent and Richard Leigh (1989) appeared. Books by Timothy Wallace-Murphy and Andrew Sinclair soon followed from the early 1990s onwards.

The alleged voyage to North America

One of the most common theories about Sinclair is that he was one of the first Europeans to visit North America in a voyage pre-dating Columbus. In 1784, he was identified by Johann Reinhold Forster as possibly being the Prince Zichmni described in letters allegedly written around the year 1400 by the Zeno brothers of Venice, in which they describe a voyage throughout the North Atlantic under the command of Zichmni.

The letters and the accompanying map, allegedly rediscovered and published in the early 16th century, are regarded by most historians as a hoax by the Zenos or their publishers. Moreover, the identification of Zichmni as Henry Sinclair has not been accepted by most historians, although this identification and their overall authenticity are taken for granted by the supporters of the theory.

The claim that Henry Sinclair explored North America has been popularised by several other authors, notably by Frederick J. Pohl, Andrew Sinclair, Michael Bradley, William S. Crooker (who claimed to have discovered Henry Sinclair's castle in Nova Scotia), Steven Sora, and more recently by David Goudsward. 

The claim requires the acceptance not only that the letters and map ascribed to the Zeno brothers and published in 1558 are authentic, but that the voyage described in the letters as taken by Zichmni around the year 1398 to Greenland actually reached North America and that Zichmni is Henry Sinclair. It is also bolstered by claims that carvings in Rosslyn Chapel represent American plants. 

The name "Zichmni" is either totally fictitious, or quite possibly a transliteration error when converting from handwritten materials to type. Forster tried to relate this to the name "Sinclair", while to Pohl "Prince Zichmni" was a misread rendering of the title "Prince of Orkney", which he attributed to Sinclair.

One primary criticism of this theory is that if either a Sinclair or a Templar voyage reached the Americas, they did not, unlike Columbus, return with a historical record of their findings. In fact, there is no known published documentation from that era to support the theory that such a voyage took place.  The physical evidence relies on speculative reasoning to support the theory, and all of it can be interpreted in other ways.  For example, according to one historian, the carvings in Rosslyn Chapel may not be of American plants at all but are nothing more than stylized carvings of wheat and strawberries.

Alleged Templar connections 
Intertwined with the Sinclair voyage story is the claim that Henry Sinclair was a Knight Templar and that the voyage either was sponsored by or conducted on the behalf of the Templars, though the order was suppressed almost half a century before Henry's lifetime.

Knight and Lomas speculate that the Knights Templar discovered under the Temple Mount in Jerusalem a royal archive dating from King Solomon's times that stated that Phoenicians from Tyre voyaged to a westerly continent following a star called "La Merika" named after the Nasoraean Mandaean morning star. According to Knight and Lomas, the Templars learned that to sail to that continent, they had to follow a star by the same name. Sinclair supposedly followed this route.

The theory also makes use of the supposed Templar connection to explain the name Nova Scotia ("New Scotland" in Latin). It is based on the 18th-century tale that some Templars escaped the suppression of their order by fleeing to Scotland during the reign of Robert the Bruce and fought in the Battle of Bannockburn.

Claims persist that Rosslyn Chapel contains Templar imagery. Andrew Sinclair speculates that the grave slab now in the crypt is that of a Templar knight: According to author Robert Lomas, the chapel also has an engraving depicting a knight templar holding the sword over a head of an initiate, supposedly to protect the secrets of the templars. Rosslyn Chapel was built by Sir William St Clair, last St Clair Earl of Orkney, who was the grandson of Henry. According to Lomas, Sir William, the chapel builder, is also the direct ancestor of the first Grand Master of Masons of Scotland, also named William St Clair (Sinclair).

According to Lomas, the Sinclairs and their French relatives, the St. Clairs, were instrumental in creating the Knights Templar. He claims that the founder of Templars Hugues de Payens was married to a sister of the Duke of Champaine (Henri de St. Clair), who was a powerful broker of the first Crusade and had the political power to nominate the Pope, and to suggest the idea and empower it to the Pope.

However, a biography of Hughes de Payens by Thierry Leroy identifies his wife and the mother of his children as Elizabeth de Chappes. The book draws its information on the marriage from local church cartularies dealing chiefly with the disposition of the Grand Master's properties, the earliest alluding to Elizabeth as his wife in 1113, and others spanning de Payens’ lifetime, the period following his death and lastly her own death in 1170.

Historians Mark Oxbrow, Ian Robertson, Karen Ralls and Louise Yeoman have each made it clear that the Sinclair family had no connection with the mediaeval Knights Templar. Karen Ralls has shown that among those testifying against the Templars at their 1309 trial were Henry and William Sinclair – an act inconsistent with any alleged support or membership.

See also
 Zeno map
 Zeno brothers
 Westford Knight
 Knights Templar legends#Discoverers of the New World
 Barony of Roslin
 Lord Sinclair
 Earl of Caithness
 Lord Herdmanston

References

Further reading
 Earl Henry Sinclair's fictitious trip to America by Brian Smith, First published in New Orkney Antiquarian Journal, vol. 2, 2002
 The Sinclair Saga, by Mark Finnan, 1999, Formac Press, 
 Rosslyn: Guardian of the Secrets of the Holy Grail, by Tim Wallace-Murphy and Marilyn Hopkins, 1999, Harper–Collins Canada, 
 Second Messiah: Templars, the Turin Shroud and the Great Secret of Freemasonry, by Christopher Knight and Robert Lomas, Fair Winds Press, 2001, 
 "Of course the Chinese didn't discover America. But then nor did Columbus" by Simon Jenkins, 20 January 2006 article in The Guardian mentioning the La Merika theory among others
 "The ship of dreams" by Diane MacLean, 13 May 2005, Scotsman.com
 "The Sinclair Voyage to America" Renaissance Magazine #12, 1999
 Brief biography in support of theory

Orkney, Henry Sinclair
Orkney, Henry Sinclair
Henry
Henry
Earls of Orkney
Orkney, Henry Sinclair
Orkney, Henry Sinclair
Orkney, Henry Sinclair
Orkney, Henry Sinclair
Orkney, Henry Sinclair
Orkney, Henry Sinclair
History of Shetland
14th-century Scottish military personnel